Avinyó is a Catalan municipality in Spain.  It is located in the province of Barcelona and in the comarca of Bages.  Its current mayor is Eudald Vilaseca Font and its population in 2002 was estimated at 2,000 residents.

References

External links
 Government data pages 

Municipalities in Bages